"East Bound and Down" is a song written by Jerry Reed and Deena Kaye Rose, and recorded by Reed for the soundtrack for the film Smokey and the Bandit. The song features Reed on the lead vocal, and vocalist Gordon Stoker of the Jordanaires on the harmony vocal. It was released in August 1977 as a single on RCA Records.  The song's lyrics tell the basic plot line of the movie (leaving out the runaway bride element) of making a 28-hour round-trip run from Atlanta, Georgia, to Texarkana, Texas, and back to illegally transport 400 cases of Coors beer for an after-race celebration.

The song spent 16 weeks on the U.S. country music charts, reaching a peak of No. 2. It also reached No. 3 on the Bubbling Under Hot 100.

The "...and Down" in the title and lyric is CB radio jargon for "I'm finished transmitting, but still listening to the channel." "[Direction] bound and down" remains a common sign-off for truckers on CB radio.

Chart performance

Cover versions
 A variant version of the song, titled "West Bound and Down," was also recorded by Reed and included on the Smokey and the Bandit soundtrack.  This variant is played during the westbound portion of the movie.  The lyric "East bound and down -- loaded up and truckin'" is changed to "West bound and down -- eighteen wheels a-rollin'."  The music and the rest of the lyrics remain the same. 
 A cover was recorded in 2005 by Canadian country music group The Road Hammers. Other cover versions include Aaron Tippin, Supersuckers, Dave Dudley, and Tonic.
 The song was recorded by punk rock cover band Me First and the Gimme Gimmes on their sixth album, Love Their Country.
 "East Bound and Down" was recorded by Jessy Lynn Martens for the TV series Archer under the pseudonym "Cherlene."
 "East Bound and Down" was recorded by the Supersuckers on their 2005 album Devil's Food.
 "East Bound and Down" was performed by Midland at the 52nd Country Music Association Awards in 2018
 "East Bound and Down" was recorded by Po' Ramblin' Boys featuring Jason Carter & Bronwyn Keith-Hynes as a single in 2021.
 The Ford Motor Company revived the song's popularity as part of its F-Series truck advertisements in 2018, where a host of pickups from different years and towing various items, such as barbecue grills, a 1960s-era Ford Bronco, and a statue of the Big Boy mascot, is seen driving down the highway.

Notes

References

1977 singles
Jerry Reed songs
Songs written by Jerry Reed
The Road Hammers songs
Aaron Tippin songs
Songs written by Deena Kaye Rose
1977 songs
RCA Records singles
Smokey and the Bandit
Songs written for films
Songs about alcohol
Songs about truck driving